Caledoconcha carnosa is a species of snail of the family Hydrobiidae. The species is endemic to Monéo River of New Caledonia, and is classed as Critically endangered due to the destruction of its habitat.

References

Hydrobiidae
Gastropods described in 1998
Molluscs of Oceania